The 2017 All-Ireland Senior Football Championship Final, the 130th event of its kind and the culmination of the 2017 All-Ireland Senior Football Championship, was played at Croke Park in Dublin on 17 September 2017.

The final was the fourth occasion that the two counties met in the final, following matches in 1921, 2013 and 2016. Prior to the game, Dublin were seeking their third consecutive All-Ireland title, while Mayo were aiming for their first All-Ireland since 1951. The same two counties played in the ladies' All-Ireland final. This was only the second time that the final pairing had been the same in the men's and ladies' championships; the first time was in 1982, when Kerry played Offaly in the men's and ladies' finals. It was the second consecutive year that a team qualified under the system of second chances introduced in 2001; Mayo played despite defeat in its provincial championship.

Dublin won the final by a point on a 1–17 to 1–16 scoreline to claim their third title in a row, the first time this has happened since 1921–23.

The final was played before a capacity attendance of 82,243 people. The match drew a peak audience of 1.3 million, which made it the most watched RTÉ broadcast of 2017, surpassing the hurling final. The following year, Martin Breheny listed this as the fourth greatest All-Ireland Senior Football Championship Final.

The game was televised nationally on RTÉ2 as part of The Sunday Game live programme, presented by Michael Lyster from Croke Park, with studio analysis from Joe Brolly, Pat Spillane, and Colm O'Rourke. Match commentary was provided by Ger Canning with analysis by Dessie Dolan. The game was also televised internationally by Sky Sports, presented by Rachel Wyse and Brian Carney.

Paths to the final
The two teams had widely varying paths to the final. Whereas Mayo struggled (losing to Galway, needing extra time to beat Derry and Cork and replays to beat Roscommon and Kerry), Dublin breezed to the final, winning their five games by 12, 31, 9, 10 and 12 points respectively.

Mayo

Dublin

Pre-match

Jubilee team
The Donegal team that won the 1992 All-Ireland Final were presented to the crowd before the match to mark 25 years.

Ticketing
Demand for tickets was extremely high in both counties with Dublin and Mayo receiving around 32,000 tickets between them. Stand tickets were priced at €80 with terrace at €40.

Related events
The 2017 All-Ireland Minor Football Final was played between Kerry and Derry as a curtain-raiser to the senior final, with Kerry winning by 6–17 to 1–8.

Match

Officials
On 4 September, Cavan's Joe McQuillan was confirmed as the referee for the final. It was McQuilllan's third All Ireland final having previously been in charge in 2011 and 2013. Cork's Conor Lane was the standby referee, the other linesman was Padraig O’Sullivan from Kerry and the Sideline official was Niall Cullen.

Build-up
The All-Ireland final was played between Dublin and Mayo, the second consecutive meeting of the teams in the decisive match. The reigning champions, Dublin, had defeated Mayo following a replay, and were looking to claim their third consecutive title. Dublin were favourites to win prior to throw-in.  Pre-match discussion in the media revolved around the Mayo curse, a superstition held among GAA fans that Mayo will not win the All-Ireland until every member of the victorious 1951 team had died. The curse allegedly arose after a priest punished the team for celebrating rapturously in front of a funeral procession.

The game attracted additional international information as association football pundits Jeff Stelling and Chris Kamara made their commentary debut at a GAA game, alongside legendary GAA commentator Mícheál Ó Muircheartaigh.

Team news
Dublin and Mayo both named the same fifteen players that played in the semi-final wins for the final.
Prior to the start of the match, Eoghan O'Gara was named to start for Dublin instead of Niall Scully, with Paddy Durcan also starting instead of Diarmuid O'Connor for Mayo.

Summary
The game took place in Croke Park before a capacity audience of 82,000. After 90 seconds of play, Dublin took a definitive lead as Con O'Callaghan scored a goal when he ran at the Mayo defence before shooting low along the ground to the corner of the net at the hill 16 end. However, despite this early three-point lead, Mayo played dominantly throughout the opening 35 minutes, scoring seven points from play to take a one-point lead in at half-time, 0–9 to 1–05. Andy Moran was responsible for three of these points, and his first-half performance was praised by pundits.

However, after the second half began, the game took on a different complexion as Dublin seized the lead by scoring three consecutive points. However, Mayo reclaimed the lead early into the half as Lee Keegan scored a goal to put his team one point ahead. The talking point of the match occurred in the 48th minute, as Dublin's John Small, who had previously received a yellow card in the first half, was sent off for a foul on Colm Boyle. However, Donal Vaughan of Mayo was also sent off after striking Small in the face in retaliation for the foul. This left both teams reduced to fourteen men for the remaining duration of the game. After seventy minutes of the game had elapsed, the teams were tied at 1–16 apiece, and it appeared that the game was destined for a draw and replay. In the seventy-first minute, Mayo were awarded a kickable free and an opportunity to go ahead. Cillian O'Connor, who had missed a free under a similar scenario in the previous final, took the kick, and missed, having it strike the post and rebound away from goal. Then, with a mere minute of the six additional minutes remaining, Diarmuid Connolly was fouled approximately forty-five metres from the Mayo goal, leaving Dublin with a kick to win the game. Dean Rock, the son of Barney Rock, one of the most famous Gaelic footballers from the capital, took the free. Lee Keegan controversially threw a GPS device at Rock as he took the free, yet the Dubliner was undeterred and converted. This left the defending champions one point ahead. Ciarán Kilkenny was then given a black card as Dublin looked to win the Mayo kickout. With Dublin now down to 13 men, they reclaiming possession as David Clarke kicked the ball over the Cusack stand sideline. Dublin maintained possession for approximately 90 seconds until the final whistle was blown. Stephen Cluxton, the Dublin captain, then lifted the Sam Maguire Cup for the fifth time in seven years.

Details

Trophy presentation
Dublin captain Stephen Cluxton accepted the Sam Maguire Cup from GAA president Aogán Ó Fearghail in the Hogan Stand. Cluxton was making a record 91st championship appearances and lifted the cup for a record fourth time. He was one of 12 Dublin players who collected their fifth senior All-Ireland winners medal. The 12 Dublin players became the only men outside of Kerry to win five senior All-Ireland winners medals in Gaelic football.

Reaction
Highlights of the final were shown on The Sunday Game programme which aired at 9:30 pm that night on RTÉ2 and was presented by Des Cahill. James McCarthy, Dean Rock and Chris Barrett were shortlisted for the Man of the Match award. The winner was James McCarthy with GAA president Aogán Ó Fearghail presenting the award at the Dublin post match function, held in the Gibson hotel.

Celebrations
The Dublin team had a homecoming celebration the day after the final at Smithfield in Dublin which started at 6:30 pm.		
The night before, players and their management team celebrated their win at The Gibson Hotel.

References

External links
 Watch Jeff & Kammy's Journey to Croker:
 Final only (12 minutes)
 Full-length (50 minutes)

Final
All-Ireland Senior Football Championship Final, 2017
All-Ireland Senior Football Championship Final
All-Ireland Senior Football Championship Finals
Dublin county football team matches
Mayo county football team matches